Even the Strong Get Lonely is the twenty-fifth studio album by American country music singer-songwriter Tammy Wynette. It was released on June 20, 1983, by Epic Records.

Commercial performance 
The album peaked at No. 66 on the Billboard Country Albums chart. The album's first single, "Unwed Fathers", and second single, "Still in the Ring", both peaked at No. 63 on the Billboard Country Singles chart.

Track listing

Personnel
Adapted from the album liner notes.
David Briggs - keyboards
Mike Douchette - acoustic guitar, harmonica
Mike Leech - bass
Farrell Morris - percussion
Weldon Myrick - steel guitar
The Nashville String Machine - strings
George Richey - producer
Jerry Stembridge - acoustic guitar
James Stroud - drums
Pete Wade - lead guitar
D. Bergen White - spring arrangements
Hank Williams - mastering
Tommy Williams - fiddle
Tammy Wynette - lead vocals

Chart positions

Album

Singles

References

1983 albums
Tammy Wynette albums
Epic Records albums
Albums produced by George Richey